The Benisheik massacre was a massacre that occurred on 18 September 2013 in Benisheik, Borno State, Nigeria.
Some 161 people were killed. Boko Haram took responsibility for the attacks.

Details
Benisheik, is located between the cities of Damaturu and Maiduguri in Borno State. The attack began on 18 September. The rebels arrived in the city through a convoy of over twenty trucks, dressed in stolen Nigerian Army uniforms and carrying anti-aircraft weapons.
Allegedly, the attack was launched by Boko Haram in response to self-defense militas that were attempting to protect the city. The rebels entered the city and set fire to numerous buildings and set up roadside checkpoints on the road between Damaturu and Maiduguri. Drivers at these roadblocks were killed if they lived in Borno State, while others were apparently free to go.

Two days later, Boko Haram claimed responsibility for the attack.

Casualties
The day after the attack, Borno State officials put the death toll at 87, though they were still looking for new bodies.

On 22 September Abdulaziz Kolomi, of the state's environmental protection agency, said that an additional 55 bodies had been found, raising the death toll to 142. According to police sources, another 16 bodies were found in Benisheik and another 19 between Maiduguri and Bamboa. The Daily Trust reported that in total 161 people had been killed; 142 travelers, 2 soldiers, 3 police officers and 14 citizens.

References

2013 murders in Nigeria
Massacres in 2013
Massacres perpetrated by Boko Haram
Islamic terrorist incidents in 2013
Terrorist incidents in Nigeria in 2013
September 2013 events in Nigeria